Ragnhild was the name of a number of steamships, including:

, in service 1942–46

Ship names